Loïc Vliegen (born 20 December 1993 in Rocourt) is a Belgian cyclist, who currently rides for UCI WorldTeam . He was named in the startlist for the 2017 Vuelta a España. In May 2018, he was named in the startlist for the Giro d'Italia.

Major results

2011
 3rd  Road race, UEC European Junior Road Championships
2012
 5th La Roue Tourangelle
 6th Giro del Belvedere
2013
 5th Flèche Ardennaise
 7th Internationale Wielertrofee Jong Maar Moedig
 9th Liège–Bastogne–Liège Espoirs
2014
 1st Overall Triptyque Ardennais
1st Stage 1
 2nd Flèche Ardennaise
 2nd Internationale Wielertrofee Jong Maar Moedig
 4th Liège–Bastogne–Liège Espoirs
 7th London–Surrey Classic
 7th Piccolo Giro di Lombardia
 8th Overall Arctic Race of Norway
 8th Omloop Het Nieuwsblad U23
2015
 1st Flèche Ardennaise
 1st Stage 3 Tour des Pays de Savoie
 2nd Overall Tour de Bretagne
1st  Young rider classification
1st Stage 7
 2nd Overall Course de la Paix U23
1st Stage 3
 5th Trofeo Banca Popolare di Vicenza
 5th Liège–Bastogne–Liège Espoirs
 7th Internationale Wielertrofee Jong Maar Moedig
 8th Overall Tour de Wallonie
 8th Giro del Belvedere
 10th Kattekoers
2016
 1st  Mountains classification, Three Days of De Panne
 4th Le Samyn
 9th Amstel Gold Race
 9th Volta Limburg Classic
 10th Brabantse Pijl
2017
 1st Stage 1 (TTT) Vuelta a España
 9th Overall Tour de Wallonie
 9th Volta Limburg Classic
 10th Grand Prix Pino Cerami
 10th Grand Prix de Wallonie
2018
 5th Overall Dubai Tour
2019
 1st  Overall Tour de Wallonie
1st Stage 2
 4th Dwars door het Hageland
 5th Tokyo 2020 Test Event
 8th Overall Tour of Belgium
2020
 1st Tour du Doubs
 6th Trofeo Serra de Tramuntana
 8th Pollença–Andratx
2022
 2nd Overall Tour de Wallonie
 3rd Clásica Jaén Paraíso Interior
 3rd Volta Limburg Classic
 5th Dwars door het Hageland
 5th Vuelta a Murcia
 5th Le Samyn
2023
 8th Vuelta a Murcia

Grand Tour general classification results timeline

References

External links

1993 births
Living people
Belgian male cyclists
Sportspeople from Liège
Cyclists from Liège Province